Louis Dampier (born November 20, 1944) is an American retired professional basketball player.

A 6-foot-tall guard, Dampier is one of only a handful of men to play all nine seasons in the American Basketball Association (ABA) (1967–1976), all with the Kentucky Colonels. He also was one of just two players to play all nine ABA seasons with the same team; the other was Byron Beck of the Denver Rockets, later renamed the Nuggets.

After the ABA–NBA merger in 1976 Dampier also played three seasons (1976–1979) in the National Basketball Association (NBA) with the San Antonio Spurs.  Dampier was inducted as a member of the Naismith Memorial Basketball Hall of Fame in 2015.

High school
Dampier was born in Indianapolis and played at Southport High School; leading the Cardinals to two IHSAA Sectional titles and the finals of the IHSAA Regionals in 1961-62 and 1962-63. He also played in the Annual All-Star game featuring the top high school Senior players from Indiana and Kentucky.  During the series following his senior season (1962-63) Dampier faced a Kentucky team led by Clem Haskins and Wayne Chapman.  Dampier averaged 8.5 points as the Indiana team split the series with Kentucky.

University of Kentucky

Dampier was a two-sport athlete at the University of Kentucky, playing baseball as well as basketball. Playing under coach Adolph Rupp, Dampier, Tommy Kron and Pat Riley led Rupp's Runts to the 1966 NCAA championship game, where they lost to Texas Western College (now the University of Texas at El Paso) in a watershed game for college basketball. This game spearheaded the end of racial segregation in college basketball. 

During his three years at Kentucky (at the time, freshmen were ineligible to play varsity sports), Dampier was a two-time All-American and three-time All-Southeastern Conference selection. He was also named Academic All-SEC twice and Academic All-American once. Upon graduation from Kentucky in 1967, Dampier scored 1,575 points, at the time third-most in school history behind only Cotton Nash (1,770) and Alex Groza (1,744).

Pro basketball
In 1967, the Cincinnati Royals (now the Sacramento Kings) selected Dampier in the fourth round of the NBA Draft and the Kentucky Colonels selected him in the ABA draft.  Dampier eventually signed with the Kentucky Colonels of the fledgling ABA and teamed with Darel Carrier to form the most explosive backcourt duo in the league. In each of the ABA's first three seasons, both Dampier and Carrier averaged at least 20 points per game. Both were three-point field goal specialists (the ABA had used the three-point field goal from its inception), but especially Dampier who made 500 during a three-year stretch: a record 199 during the 1968–69 season, 198 in 1969–70 and 103 in 1970–71. At the conclusion of the ABA's history, Dampier made a career-record 794 3-point field goals.

He also finished first all-time in the ABA in games played (728), minutes played (27,770), points scored (13,726), and assists (4,044). During the 1970–71 season, he hit 57 consecutive free throws for what was then a pro record (ABA or NBA). Seven times, he was named an ABA All-Star. He was a unanimous choice for the ABA Top 30 team. He played on the Colonels' 1975 ABA championship team, which featured a later Kentucky standout, Dan Issel, as well as 7'2" center Artis Gilmore.

After the 1976 season, the ABA ceased operations with Kentucky and two other teams folding. Dampier was selected by the San Antonio Spurs (one of the four teams to join the NBA in the ABA–NBA merger) in the 1976 ABA Dispersal Draft. Playing mostly as a role player behind George Gervin, Dampier averaged 6.7 points in 232 NBA games.

Dampier later served as an assistant coach with the Denver Nuggets.

Several divisions in the 21st century semi-pro ABA were initially named after stars of the old ABA, including Dampier.

Dampier was inducted into the Naismith Memorial Basketball Hall of Fame in September 2015.

ABA and NBA career statistics

Regular season

|-
| style="text-align:left;"| 
| style="text-align:left;"| Kentucky (ABA)
| 72 || - || 41.1 || .421 || .268 || .823 || 4.6 || 3.6 || - || - || 20.7
|-
| style="text-align:left"|
| style="text-align:left;"| Kentucky (ABA)
| 78 || - || style="background:#cfecec;"|42.6* || .420 || .361 || .811 || 3.8 || 5.8 || - || - || 24.8
|-
| style="text-align:left;"| 
| style="text-align:left;"| Kentucky (ABA)
| 82 || - || 40.9 || .399 || .361 || .831 || 3.8 || 5.5 || - || - || 26.0
|-
| style="text-align:left;"|
| style="text-align:left;"| Kentucky (ABA)
| 84 || - || 38.3 || .418 || .368 || .851 || 3.5 || 5.5 || - || - || 18.5
|-
| style="text-align:left;"|
| style="text-align:left;"| Kentucky (ABA)
| 83 || - || 38.7 || .442 || .361 || .836 || 3.1 || 6.2 || - || - || 15.9
|-
| style="text-align:left;"| 
| style="text-align:left;"| Kentucky (ABA)
| 80 || - || 38.0 || .451 || .348 || .784 || 2.7 || 6.5 || 1.2 || 0.1 || 16.8
|-
| style="text-align:left;"| 
| style="text-align:left;"| Kentucky (ABA)
| 84 || - || 35.0 || .465 ||style="background-color:#cfecec"|.387* || .832 || 2.4 || 5.6 || 1.0 || 0.2 || 17.8
|-
| style="text-align:left;background:#afe6fa"| †
| style="text-align:left;"| Kentucky (ABA)
| 83 || - || 34.7 || .500 || .396 || .809 || 2.5 || 5.4 || 1.1 || 0.6 || 16.8
|-
| style="text-align:left;"| 
| style="text-align:left;"| Kentucky (ABA)
| 82 || - || 34.6 || .479 || .368 || .863 || 1.9 || 5.7 || 0.7 || 0.6 || 13.0
|-
| style="text-align:left;"| 
| style="text-align:left;"| San Antonio
| 80 || - || 20.4 || .460 || - || .744 || 1.0 || 2.9 || 0.6 || 0.2 || 6.6
|-
| style="text-align:left;"|
| style="text-align:left;"| San Antonio
| 82 || - || 24.8 || .509 || - || .752 || 1.5 || 3.5 || 1.1 || 0.2 || 9.1
|-
| style="text-align:left;"|
| style="text-align:left;"| San Antonio
| 70 || - || 10.9 || .490 || - || .744 || 0.9 || 1.8 || 0.5 || 0.1 || 3.9
|- class="sortbottom"
| style="text-align:center;" colspan=2| Career
| 960 || - || 33.5 || .444 || .358 || .820 || 2.6 || 4.9 || 0.9 || 0.2 || 15.9

Playoffs

|-
| style="text-align:left;"|  1968
| style="text-align:left;"| Kentucky (ABA)
| 5 || - || 44.8 || .442 || .405 || .839 || 4.8 || 4.6 || - || - || 26.6
|-
| style="text-align:left;"| 1969
| style="text-align:left;"| Kentucky (ABA)
| 7 || - || 46.6 || .357 || .291 || .870 || 4.3 || 4.0 || - || - || 22.3
|-
| style="text-align:left;"|  1970
| style="text-align:left;"| Kentucky (ABA)
| 12 || - || 43.8 || .369 || .329 || .774 || 3.8 || 6.8 || - || - || 17.7
|-
| style="text-align:left;"| 1971
| style="text-align:left;"| Kentucky (ABA)
| 19 || - || 43.6 || .385 || .319 || .742 || 4.1 || 9.4 || - || - || 16.9
|-
| style="text-align:left;|  1972
| style="text-align:left;"| Kentucky (ABA)
| 6 || - || 42.3 || .420 || .478 || .625 || 3.2 || 7.5 || - || - || 13.2
|-
| style="text-align:left;|  1973
| style="text-align:left;"| Kentucky (ABA)
| 12 || - || 34.8 || .516 || .455 || .700 || 2.1 || 3.3 || - || - || 13.4
|-
| style="text-align:left;|  1974
| style="text-align:left;"| Kentucky (ABA)
| 8 || - || 28.6 || .483 || .500 || .778 || 2.0 || 4.0 || 0.8 || 0.0 || 13.4
|-
| style="text-align:left;background:#afe6fa;"|  1975†
| style="text-align:left;"| Kentucky (ABA)
| 15 || - || 40.3 || .509 || .385 || .868 || 2.4 || 7.5 || 1.3 || 0.5 || 16.9
|-
| style="text-align:left;"|  1976
| style="text-align:left;"| Kentucky (ABA)
| 10 || - || 39.3 || .519 || .500 || .900 || 1.3 || 7.7 || 1.1 || 0.5 || 16.0
|-
| style="text-align:left;"|  1977
| style="text-align:left;"| San Antonio
| 2 || - || 31.0 || .250 || - || 1.000 || 1.5 || 4.5 || 0.5 || 0.5 || 6.0
|-
| style="text-align:left;"|  1978
| style="text-align:left;"| San Antonio
| 6 || - || 21.5 || .459 || - || .250 || 1.2 || 2.5 || 0.7 || 0.3 || 5.8
|-
| style="text-align:left;"|  1979
| style="text-align:left;"| San Antonio
| 7 || - || 7.9 || .571 || - || .571 || 0.7 || 1.1 || 0.4 || 0.1 || 2.9
|- class="sortbottom"
| style="text-align:center;" colspan=2| Career
| 109 || - || 37.1 || .436 || .366 || .781 || 2.8 || 6.0 || 0.9 || 0.3 || 15.1

See also
 Basketball in Indiana

References

External links
Basketball-Reference.com statistics
Louie Dampier's profile at Remember the ABA

1944 births
Living people
All-American college men's basketball players
American men's basketball coaches
American men's basketball players
Basketball coaches from Indiana
Basketball players from Indianapolis
Cincinnati Royals draft picks
Denver Nuggets assistant coaches
Kentucky Colonels draft picks
Kentucky Colonels players
Kentucky Wildcats baseball players
Kentucky Wildcats men's basketball players
Naismith Memorial Basketball Hall of Fame inductees
Point guards
San Antonio Spurs players
Shooting guards